Colonial Hills Christian School was a private Christian school in Lithia Springs, Georgia, United States. It was founded in 1959 and was affiliated with the Colonial Hills Baptist Church.

Originally in East Point, Georgia, it moved to Lithia Springs in 1995.

The school closed in 2017.

References

Educational institutions established in 1959
Schools in Douglas County, Georgia
Private middle schools in Georgia (U.S. state)
Private high schools in Georgia (U.S. state)
Private elementary schools in Georgia (U.S. state)
1959 establishments in Georgia (U.S. state)
Defunct Christian schools in the United States